Kandi's Ski Trip is an American reality television series that premiered on Bravo on May 17, 2015. Developed as the fifth spin-off of The Real Housewives of Atlanta.

The show focuses on Kandi Burruss, her husband Todd Tucker and their blended family as they go on a ski trip together.

The series received relatively high ratings.

Cast

Main 
 Kandi Burruss
 Todd Tucker, Kandi's husband

Supporting 
 Mama Joyce, Kandi's mother
 Aunt Bertha, Kandi's aunt
 Weenie, Kandi's cousin

Episodes

International broadcast
In Australia, Kandi's Ski Trip premiered on Arena on August 2, 2015. In the United Kingdom, the reality series airs on ITVBe.

References

External links 

 

2010s American reality television series
2015 American television series debuts
2015 American television series endings
English-language television shows
Bravo (American TV network) original programming
Television shows set in Atlanta
The Real Housewives spin-offs
American television spin-offs
Reality television spin-offs